Procession, also known as The Procession, is a 1982 mural and sculpture by artists Dallas Cole and Scott Wylie, with additional contributions by Jill Perry and Joanne Haines, installed outside the Hilton Hotel in Eugene, Oregon, in the United States.

Description and history
Procession (September 1982) is an outdoor sculpture by Dallas Cole and Scott Wylie, the latter of whom designed the bricks and tiles, installed outside the west entrance of the Hilton Hotel's Conference Center. Additional contributions were made by Jill Perry and Joanne Haines. It depicts five Egyptian figures, including two dancers, two water bearers, and one person surrounded by five birds and a turtle; the intricate background includes grapes and leaves, with wavy tiles possibly representing the flow of water. The mural measures ,  x , . One plaque set into the work reads, . An indoor plaque nearby reads, .

The sculpture was surveyed and deemed "treatment needed" by the Smithsonian Institution's "Save Outdoor Sculpture!" program in October 1993. It was administered by the Cultural Services Division of the City of Eugene's Recreation and Cultural Services Department at that time.

See also
 1982 in art

References

External links
 Public Art at Jill Perry Townsend's official website

1980s murals
1982 establishments in Oregon
1982 sculptures
Birds in art
Brick sculptures
Dance in art
Murals in Oregon
Outdoor sculptures in Eugene, Oregon
Turtles in art